Daulat Singh (12 May 1875 – 14 April 1931) was the Maharaja of Idar from 1911 to 1931.

He served as a squadron commander with the Jodhpur Risala in the Tirah Campaign 1897–1898, and Boxer Rebellion in China 1900. Later, he served also in First World War as a Major in British Army from 1914 in the Great War in Egypt and the Middle East 1914-1918 and was promoted to Hon. Lieut-Col in 1918.

Daulat Singh was the son of Maharaj Bhupal Singh of Jodhpur and was adopted by his uncle, Maharaja Pratap Singh of Idar, who abdicated in his favour in 1911. He was appointed Knight Commander of the Order of the Star of India (KCSI) in the 1920 New Year Honours.

Daulat Singh was succeeded by his eldest son, Himmat Singh.

Titles
1875-1899: Rajkumar Sri Daulat Singh
1899-1902: Maharaj Sri Daulat Singh
1902-1911: Yuvaraja Sri Maharajkumar Daulat Singh Sahib
1911-1914: His Highness Maharajadhiraja Maharaja Sri Daulat Singh Sahib Bahadur, Maharaja of Idar
1914-1918: Major His Highness Maharajadhiraja Maharaja Sri Daulat Singh Sahib Bahadur, Maharaja of Idar
1918-1920: Lieutenant-Colonel His Highness Maharajadhiraja Maharaja Sri Daulat Singh Sahib Bahadur, Maharaja of Idar
1920-1926: Lieutenant-Colonel His Highness Maharajadhiraja Maharaja Sri Sir Daulat Singh Sahib Bahadur, Maharaja of Idar, KCSI
1926-1931: Colonel His Highness Maharajadhiraja Maharaja Sri Sir Daulat Singh Sahib Bahadur, Maharaja of Idar, KCSI

Honours

(ribbon bar, as it would look today)

India Medal w/ Tirah Clasp-1898
China War Medal-1900
King Edward VII Coronation Medal-1902 (w/ Delhi Durbar Bar-1903)
King George V Coronation Medal w/Delhi Durbar Bar-1911
1914-15 Star-1918
British War Medal-1918
Allied Victory Medal-1918
Knight Commander of the Order of the Star of India (KCSI)-1920

Footnotes

References
Idar page on "Genealogical Gleanings"

1875 births
1931 deaths
Knights Commander of the Order of the Star of India
Daulat
Indian knights
Indian royalty
British military personnel of the Tirah campaign
British military personnel of the Boxer Rebellion
Indian Army personnel of World War I